The 459th Flying Training Squadron is a United States Air Force squadron tasked with providing undergraduate flying training for Euro-NATO joint jet pilot candidates. Based at Sheppard Air Force Base in Texas, the unit draws its lineage from a fighter squadron that served in the China-Burma-India Theater during World War II, where it saw service against the Japanese. The squadron currently consists of instructors from seven different NATO countries.

History

World War II

The squadron was activated in August 1943 with Lockheed P-38 Lightnings and joined the 80th Fighter Group, whose three squadrons of Curtiss P-40 Warhawks had arrived in India in June.  The group completed the China-Burma-India Theater training and entered combat in September.

It supported Allied forces during the battles for northern Burma and the advance toward Rangoon bombing and strafing troop concentrations, supply dumps and lines of communications. The squadron helped protect bases in India from which cargo aircraft of Air Transport Command flew missions over the Hump to supply forces in China.  It patrolled allied airfields and attacked Japanese airfields from which enemy interceptors operated. The 459th was awarded a Distinguished Unit Citation (DUC) for destroying 119 enemy aircraft between 11 March and 19 May 1944.

The 459th Received a second DUC for intercepting a large formation of enemy aircraft while defending an allied oil refinery in Assam, India on 27 March 1944.  The squadron was credited with 66 aerial victory credits between 1 December 1943 and 13 January 1945.  The first victory was earned by Capt. Hampton Boggs, who went on to become one of the squadron's aces.  The unit continued in combat until about 6 May 1945. Shortly thereafter, it was transferred to the 33d Fighter Group, returning with the 33d to the United States, where it was inactivated at the New York Port of Embarkation on 5 November 1945.

Flying training
The squadron was activated again at Sheppard Air Force Base, Texas in April 2009 as the 459th Flying Training Squadron. The 89th Flying Training Squadron, which was conducting training with the Beechcraft T-6 Texan II at Sheppard and had grown to over twice the size of a normal training squadron, was split to form the 459th.

The 459th conducts undergraduate flying training for Euro-NATO joint jet pilot candidates. Its instructor pilots come from seven countries. In 2010, it was named top operations squadron in Air Education and Training Command.

Lineage
 Constituted as the 459 Fighter Squadron (Two Engine) on 2 August 1943
 Activated on 1 September 1943
 Inactivated on 5 November 1945
 Redesignated 459 Flying Training Squadron on 25 February 2009
 Activated on 17 April 2009

Assignments
 80th Fighter Group, 1 September 1943
 33d Fighter Group, 12 May – 5 November 1945
 80th Operations Group, 17 April 2009 – present

Stations
 Karachi, India (now Pakistan), 1 September 1943
 Kurmitola Airfield, India (now Bangladesh), 5 November 1943
 Chittagong Airport, India (now Bangladesh), 4 March 1944
 Rumkhapalong, India, 1 February 1945
 Dudhkundi Airfield, India, 11 May – 8 October 1945
 Camp Kilmer, New Jersey, 3 – 5 November 1945
 Sheppard Air Force Base, Texas, 17 April 2009 – present

Aircraft
 Lockheed P-38 Lightning, 1943–1945
 Beechcraft T-6 Texan II, 2009–present

Awards and campaigns

See also

 List of Lockheed P-38 Lightning operators

References
 Notes

 Citations

Bibliography

 
 
 

 Further reading

External links
  (artwork featuring squadron aircraft)
 
 
 
  (requires sign up to view all pages)
  (images of P-38 in squadron colors)
 

Military units and formations in Texas
Flying training squadrons of the United States Air Force